Thomas Lynn Bradford ( – February 5, 1921) of Detroit, Michigan was a spiritualist who died by suicide in an attempt to ascertain the existence of an afterlife and communicate that information to a living accomplice, Ruth Doran. On February 5, 1921, Bradford sealed his apartment in Detroit, blew out the pilot on his heater, and turned on the gas, which killed him.

Some weeks earlier, Bradford had sought a fellow spiritualist in a newspaper advertisement and Doran responded. The two agreed "that there was but one way to solve the mystery—two minds properly attuned, one of which must shed its earthly mantle". The New York Times ran a follow-up under the headline "Dead Spiritualist Silent".

References

1870s births
1921 deaths
1921 suicides
Afterlife
American spiritualists
Year of birth missing
Suicides by gas
Suicides in Michigan